Chromotropic acid is a chemical compound with the formula (HO)2C10H4(SO3H)2.

It can be used for as a reagent in the quantitative determination of the herbicide 2,4-dichlorophenoxyacetic acid (2,4-D).

Chromotropic acid is also used for testing for the presence of formaldehyde. The usefulness of this reagent in quantitative determination is the formation of a red coloration (peaking at 580 nm wavelength) when chromotropic acid in 50% sulfuric acid reacts with formaldehyde. The coloration is specific to this aldehyde and is not produced from other organic species such as other aldehydes, ketones and carboxylic acids. The NIOSH Formaldehyde method #3500 is the reference analytical standard that uses chromotropic acid.

References

1-Naphthols
Naphthalenesulfonic acids
Polyphenols